Blemus is a genus of ground beetle native to the Palearctic (including Europe) and the Nearctic.

Species include:
 Blemus alexandrovi (Lutshnik, 1915)
 Blemus discus (Fabricius, 1792)

External links

Blemus at Fauna Europaea

Trechinae